Heart's Thunder is the fourth studio album by the Dawn, released in 1990. It is the album on which guitarist Francis Reyes first played.

Track listing

Personnel
Jett Pangan - vocals
JB Leonor - drums, keyboards
Francis Reyes - guitars
Carlos Balcells - bass guitar

Album Credits 
Executive Producers: Orlando R. Ilacad
Producers: Carlos Balcells, Domingo Leonor III, Martin Galan
Arranged By: The Dawn
Cover Design: Willie A. Monzon
Graphics: Dayana D. Ballon
Photography By: Didits Gonzales
Recording Engineers: Albert Godinez & Jun Reyes
Mixed By: Alvert Godinez & Martin Galan
Technical Supports: Edouardo Lacson & Joel "Broadside" Hicap

References

1990 albums
The Dawn (band) albums
PolyEast Records albums